Reg gross (13 June 1910 – 4 February 2002) was an  Australian rules footballer who played with Geelong in the Victorian Football League (VFL).

Notes

External links 

1910 births
2002 deaths
Australian rules footballers from Victoria (Australia)
Geelong Football Club players